The short-tailed horned lizard (Phrynosoma braconnieri) is a species of lizard in the family Phrynosomatidae. The species is endemic to Mexico. It has a very distinct, shortened tail, which is sometimes not apparent.

Etymology
The specific epithet, braconnieri, is in honor of French naturalist Séraphin Braconnier (1812–1884).

Description
P. braconnieri has a very short tail relative to its body length, the shortest of the horned lizards, or indeed of any lizard, thus its common name.

Habitat
P. braconnieri inhabits pine-oak woodland and xeric thorn-scrub. It can also be found in corn fields or other traditional agricultural areas.

Geographic range
The short-tailed horned lizard is found in the Mexican states of Puebla and Oaxaca. It may also inhabit Veracruz.

Reproduction
P. braconnieri is viviparous.

References

Further reading

Arias-Balderas SF, Hernández-Ríos A, Correa-Sánchez F (2012). "Phrynosoma braconnieri (Short-tailed Horned Lizard). Predation". Herpetological Review 43 (2): 335–336.
Boulenger GA (1885). Catalogue of the Lizards in the British Museum (Natural History). Second Edition. Volume II. Iguanidæ ... London: Trustees of the British Museum (Natural History). (Taylor and Francis, printers). xiii + 497 pp. + Plates I-XXIV. (Phrynosoma braconnieri, p. 248).
Díaz-Marín CA, Luría-Manzano R, Gutiérrez-Mayén G (2019). "Body Temperature of Phrynosoma braconnieri (Squamata: Phrynosomatidae) from a Xeric Scrubland in Central Mexico". Herpetological Review 50 (2): 259–262.
Jiménez-Arcos VH, Centenero-Alcalá E, Perez-Ramos E, Santa Cruz-Padilla SA (2014). "Geographic Distribution: Phrynosoma braconnieri (Short-tailed Horned Lizard)". Herpetological Review 45 (3): 463.
Pavón-Vázquez CJ, Arvizu-Meza M (2016). "Phrynosoma braconnieri Duméril & Bocourt, 1870. Behavior". Mesoamerican Herpetology 3 (3): 727.

Phrynosoma
Reptiles described in 1870
Taxa named by Auguste Duméril
Taxa named by Marie Firmin Bocourt